Seminary Township is one of twenty townships in Fayette County, Illinois, USA.  As of the 2010 census, its population was 498 and it contained 225 housing units.

Geography

Extinct towns
 Pittsburg

Cemeteries
The township contains these five cemeteries: Collier, Daniel, Seminary, Taylor and Williams.

Major highways
  Interstate 70

Lakes
 Fish Lake

Demographics

School districts
 Mulberry Grove Community Unit School District 1
 Patoka Community Unit School District 100
 Vandalia Community Unit School District 203

Political districts
 Illinois' 19th congressional district
 State House District 102
 State House District 107
 State Senate District 51
 State Senate District 54

References
 
 United States Census Bureau 2007 TIGER/Line Shapefiles
 United States National Atlas

External links
 City-Data.com
 Illinois State Archives

Townships in Fayette County, Illinois
1859 establishments in Illinois
Populated places established in 1859
Townships in Illinois